"Watching Scotty Grow" is a song written by country music singer-songwriter Mac Davis and recorded by Bobby Goldsboro in 1970 on his album, We Gotta Start Lovin. Davis recorded his version on his 1971 album, I Believe in Music.

This song deals with a father witnessing the activities of his son growing up, while the father does his usual laid back adult activities. The phrase, "that's my boy" is used in all 3 verses. One of the verses, "Mickey Mouse says it's thirteen o'clock," refers to the Mickey Mouse watches which were popular at the time.

History
Goldsboro had many pop music hit singles in the mid to late 1960s, including his chart-topping song, "Honey", in 1968. By the early 1970s, he had begun to achieve success on the country chart as well. According to Goldsboro, he met music producer Jerry Fuller one day in Los Angeles, and Fuller encouraged him to meet one of his associates in the music business, Mac Davis. When the two met, one of Davis' songs that stood out to Goldsboro was "Watching Scotty Grow".  Goldsboro decided to record the song, but an executive with United Artists Records questioned the potential of releasing it as a single, stating that "I just don't think anyone will buy a record about a father and a son."

Reception
After the release of Goldsboro's album We Gotta Start Lovin''' in late 1970, "Watching Scotty Grow" began to receive attention from radio stations in the United States. Goldsboro stated: "They put it out and within two weeks, it was being played like a single." The record label quickly issued a 45rpm, and the song began ascending American record charts during the Christmas shopping season. It reached the top of the Billboard Easy Listening chart on January 9, 1971, where it remained for six weeks. It also peaked at #11 on the Billboard Hot 100 in February of that year and climbed to the top ten on the Billboard'' country music chart as well. The track was Goldsboro's tenth top 40 hit on the U.S. pop chart and his 12th in the Canadian RPM Magazine Top Singles charts.

Charts

See also
List of number-one adult contemporary singles of 1971 (U.S.)

References

External links 
Mac Davis 1972 album I Believe in Music release info Discogs

1970 singles
United Artists Records singles
Bobby Goldsboro songs
Mac Davis songs
Songs written by Mac Davis
Song recordings produced by Bob Montgomery (songwriter)
1970 songs
Songs about children
Songs about parenthood